Ciudad Acuña International Airport is an airport serving Ciudad Acuña, a city in the Coahuila state in México.

References

External links
 

Airports in Coahuila